Soapstick is an unincorporated community in Gordon County, in the U.S. state of Georgia.

History
Soapstick was named from the fact many of the early settlers stirred homemade batches of soap with a stick.

References

Unincorporated communities in Gordon County, Georgia
Unincorporated communities in Georgia (U.S. state)